Mara Orendain La Torre is a fashion model. She also joined the Miss Universe Philippines in 2021 but failed to make it in the Top 100 official candidates. She underwent sex reassignment surgery. She first gained media attention after sharing her discrimination story to the public when two security guards at her workplace asked her not to use the female restroom. It was met with mixed reactions from the public especially when she became the banner story of an anti-discrimination policy that gave way to the building of gender-neutral bathrooms in the Philippines even in the absence of a national law.

Biography 
She was born in 1993 in Manila, Philippines. In 2014, she also worked as a call center agent in Business Process Outsourcing companies. In the same year at Teleperformance, Mara was using the female restroom when she was told by two security guards that she could not use the female restroom even after insisting that she is a woman. She filed a lawsuit against them which gained media coverage including news outlets such as GMA News, ABS-CBN News, and The Philippine Star.

Impact 
Similar experiences of transpeople being asked not to use a bathroom that identifies their gender was happening in the past but would not gained traction due to humiliation associated with it. When Mara shared her experience of discrimination on national news, wearing pink clothe, donning pantyhose in her stilleto, strutting the hallway of prosecutor's office, and her air of confidence, her portrayal of such discrimination experience was put to a different light. It became an inspiration to the LGBTIQA plus community where 30 of that groups signed a solidarity statement in her favor to blast the discrimination. The human rights group also took notice of Mara's case who proposed a gender-neutral bathroom in the Philippines. Aside from Fridae reporting the story, The Windy City Times also delivered Mara's story to their audiences to report on such discrimination. Also, UPR Info included Mara's story as a case analysis in their universal periodic report. Soon after, a number of LGBT-themed programs aired on TV including The Richman's Daughter and Destiny Rose. Her story finally led to the enactment of Gender-Fair Ordinance that prohibits all acts of discrimination specific to the LGBTQ plus community.

Mixed reactions 
Due to non-existing policy and national laws specific to the lgbt members, she had received mixed reactions from the public including online bullying, bashing, and harassment. As her story brought their absence to the attention of policy-makers, they were prompted to create an ordinance to protect against discrimination experienced specifically by the members of the LGBT community, calling the ordinance, "the first of its kind in the Philippines", as it was the first ordinance enacted specific for the LGBTIQA members in the Philippines.

Long-term impact 
In 2018, Ateneo De Manila University followed suit by putting up an all-gender bathrooms in their campus, which, as reported by Esquire magazine published by Summit Media, "sparked heated debate". According to the magazine, Ateneo is not just the first one to put up a restroom for all genders, citing some universities in the Philippines that also installed third-gender bathrooms following Mara's story in 2014 such as St. Louis University in Baguio, Lyceum of the Philippines University, and Ateneo de Davao.

More transgender women were seen empowered to come out with their stories afterwards. In 2017, Filipino International designer Veejay Floresca went public with her story after being denied entry at Valkryie Club and The Palace Pool Club in Taguig. In 2018. KaladKaren Davila shared her story to the public after being denied entry in Makati Bar. She gained support from other celebrities including actor Dingdong Dantes who reiterated the importance of anti-discrimination bill in the Philippines.
In 2019, Gretchen Diez also shared her experience of discrimination to the public. Her case became widespread news after experiencing similar situation. She was able to use the Gender-Fair ordinance as reported by One News Philippines, calling that "first of its kind in the Philippines" to tackle all acts of discrimination which was deliberated upon and enacted following Mara's case. Due to Diez' case, the debate over the building of an all-gender restroom was brought up again to the public since, as GMA News reported, there was no national law yet covering it. But Executive Director of EnGenderRights, Atty. Clara Rita Padilla who assisted Mara in 2014, suggested to do it even without a law, citing Mara's story on the Gender-Fair ordinance as the first successful story that led to the building of the first all-gender restroom put up in Quezon City even in the absence of a national law. The Sogie Bill is yet to be passed in the Philippines.

Controversy 
In 2021, Mara became embroiled in a controversy after joining the Miss Universe Philippines. As part of the pageant's requirements was for her to submit her medical certificate of a surgery but when Mara went to see a doctor to be examined, the male doctor who examined her just sexually abused her. Mara though still managed to compose herself and was able to obtain the needed medical certificate, but during her screening, she was shocked to find out that she was being disqualified due to a mishaps in her passport. This broke out on major news outlets and different social media platforms where she received hundreds of hate messages and further harassment coming from the fans of the pageant.

Television

References 

1991 births
Living people
People from Manila
Transgender women
Filipino transgender people
Female models
Beauty pageant controversies
Filipino female models
Miss Universe